The Public Bodies Act 2011 (c 24) is an Act of the Parliament of the United Kingdom.  It has 39 sections and six schedules, and is concerned with the management of public bodies within the UK.

Impact
From 2010 levels, the number of arms-length bodies had reduced by 200 in January 2013, by 285 in March 2015 and by 378 in March 2018.

Further reading

Dommett, K and Flinders, M (2014) ‘The Centre Strikes Back: Meta-Governance, Delegation, and the Core Executive in the UK, 2010-2014, Public Administration, 93:1 pp. 1–16
House of Commons Hansard, http://www.parliament.uk/business/publications/hansard/commons/
House of Lords Hansard, http://www.parliament.uk/business/publications/hansard/lords/

References

United Kingdom Acts of Parliament 2011
Reform in the United Kingdom